HNO may refer to:
 Croatian National Committee (Hrvatski Narodni Odbor), an organization founded by the Ustaša Branimir Jelić
 Croatian National Resistance (Hrvatski narodni otpor), an organization founded by the Ustaša Maks Luburić
 Hockey Northwestern Ontario
 Nitroxyl
 hno, ISO 639-3 code for the Northern Hindko language of Pakistan